Dirk M. Sandefur (born October 22, 1961) is an associate justice of the Montana Supreme Court. His term began on January 2, 2017. He served for eight years as a criminal and civil Deputy Attorney for Cascade County, Montana, before being elected a judge on the 8th Judicial District of the Montana District Court in 2002. He ran for and won election to the Montana Supreme Court in 2016.

Early life and education
Dirk Sandefur was born on October 22, 1961, in Great Falls, Montana, to Glenn and Kathleen ( Kirwan) Sandefur. He has two siblings, Penny (a sister) and Pat (a brother). His father was a Korean War veteran who became an auto body mechanic and classic car restorer, and his mother a homemaker.

Sandefur attended Great Falls High School, where he graduated with honors in 1980. He then enrolled at the University of Montana in Missoula, graduating (with honors) in 1985 with a Bachelor of Science degree in computer science.

Sandefur worked as an aide to a construction inspector with the United States Army Corps of Engineers at Malmstrom Air Force Base from 1984 to 1986. In 1987, he moved to Havre, Montana, graduated from the Montana Law Enforcement Academy, and became a police officer. In 1990, Sandefur entered the Alexander Blewett III School of Law at the University of Montana (UM Law School). Now married and with children, Sandefur worked full-time while attending law school. He graduated with high honors in 1993, third in his class of 75.

Legal career
Sandefur was admitted to the State Bar of Montana in 1993. He worked for a year as an associate in private practice, and in 1994 took a position as a contract public defender with the Office of the State Public Defender. In 1994, Sandefur became a Deputy Cascade County Attorney, at first prosecuting criminal cases and later serving as Chief Civil Deputy Attorney, overseeing matters such as contracts, education and school law, election law, employment law, law enforcement, property tax disputes, property transactions, real estate subdivision, tort claims, and zoning.  He also served concurrently as general counsel to the county.

In 2002, the Montana Legislature added a fourth judge to the 8th Judicial District of the Montana District Court. In a four-way nonpartisan primary race, Sandefur won with 40.6 percent of the vote. As per state law, the top two vote-getters advanced to the general election. In a hotly contested race. Sandefur beat E. Lee Leveque for a six-year term as district court judge, 54.4 to 45.6 percent.

Under Montana state law, judges in uncontested nonpartisan primary elections automatically advance to the general election. The general election then becomes a choice of "retain/do not retain". Sandefur ran unopposed in the 2008 primary, and was retained by a vote of 85.2 to 14.8 percent. Sandefur was unopposed again in the 2014 primary election, and was retained by a vote of 88.7 to 11.3 percent.

The 8th Judicial District is Montana's third-busiest district court. According to an independent study, Sandefur annually disposed of twice the number of cases expected for a judge. Cascade County Attorney John Parker later said Sandefur garnered a reputation for being a tough but fair jurist. On occasion, he also served as a substitute justice on the Montana Supreme Court.

Montana Supreme Court

2016 primary election
In 2015, Montana State Supreme Court Associate Justice Patricia O'Brien Cotter announced she would not seek re-election. On February 5, 2015, Sandefur filed to run for Cotter's seat. Over the next six weeks, Sandefur raised $46,431, and spent $2,834. The Bozeman Daily Chronicle described it as a "fast out of the gate" fundraising pace.

Sandefur's first opponent emerged in May 2015 when Kristen Juras, a private-practice attorney and former UM Law School adjunct professor, filed for Cotter's seat as well. Supporters of the two candidates reflected the distinct judicial philosophies of Sandefur and Juras. In June, Dave Galt, executive director of the Montana Petroleum Association and secretary-treasurer of the Montana Gas and Oil Political Action Committee, hosted a fundraiser for Juras. Co-hosts included Errol Galt, the Republican National Committee member; Chuck Denowh, executive director of the Montana Republican Party; and staff of the Montana Group, a public relations firm which worked primarily for conservative candidates. About the same time, Sandefur himself hosted a fundraising event which attracted donors such as Jorge Quintana, Democratic National Committee member; Pam Bucy, the Democratic Montana Commissioner of Labor and Industry; and Maggie Moran, executive director of NARAL Pro-Choice Montana. Over the next six months, Sandefur raised about $100,000, leaving him with $133,000 cash on hand. Juras raised $41,000, leaving her with $22,400 cash on hand.  Both candidates found strong support in the legal and business communities. By the end of 2015, Sandefur had raised a total of $190,115.  Juras collected only $48,000, but maintained that she had turned down money because both candidates automatically advanced to the general election unless a third candidate emerged. (State law required judicial candidates to return primary donations if they automatically advanced.) Sandefur countered claims that he was relying on liberal donors by noting that his state election finance report showed 136 Republicans and 124 Democrats among his 902 contributors.

During the primary season, the candidates appeared together only once, in Missoula at a forum in March 2016 sponsored by the American Civil Liberties Union (ACLU).

On March 11, 2016, Eric Mills, a private-practice attorney, also filed for Cotter's Supreme Court seat. By the end of May 2016, Sandefur had raised $248,000 and spent $116,000, while Juras raised $94,000 and $66,000. Mills raised $270.

In the June 7, 2016, nonpartisan primary, Juras won 44.1 percent of the votes (100,846), Sandefur received 34.5 percent of the votes (78,855), and Mills was last with 21.4 of the vote (48,965). Juras and Sandefur advanced to the general (nonpartisan) election.

2016 general election
By the end of August, Sandefur had raised a total of $329,053 in 2015 and 2016, while Juras raised a total of $159,055 in the same period. By this time, MEA-MFT, the Montana AFL-CIO, Montana Conservation Voters, a number of district and municipal court judges, Montana Supreme Court Chief Justice Mike McGrath, retiring Associate Justice Cotter, and 10 retired Montana Supreme Court justices had endorsed Sandefur. Juras, meanwhile, won the endorsements of the Montana Bankers Association, Montana Chamber of Commerce, Montana Contractors Association, and Montana Farm Bureau Federation PAC.

The general election race was a contentious one. The first general election public forum at which Sandefur and Juras met was in Great Falls on September 7. Juras emphasized her work for farmers, ranches, and small business owners, and claimed Sandefur had injected partisan politics into the race.  Sandefur argued Juras had little real courtroom experience, and denigrated at her stand on a number of legal issues (including ongoing litigation over the Montana Stream Access Law). At a Western Montana Bar Association forum a week later, the legal community audience asked tough questions about Juras' position on the stream access law, her legal work for the Crop Growers Insurance (which was under state investigation for money laundering and making illegal campaign contributions), and comments she made on the radio about injecting conservative Judeo-Christian ethics into her legal decision-making. Sandefur strongly attacked Juras' on the same issues.

In October, the news media reported that the Republican State Leadership Committee (RSLC; a political organization dedicated to helping Republicans win state office) was spending heavily to defeat Sandefur. The RSLC, which spent almost $500,000 in 2014 Montana Supreme Court races, gave $93,065 to a Montana group organized to oppose Sandefur, which included $21,361 for television advertising and $43,000 for polling and opposition research. Controversially, the RSLC paid for an attack ad titled "Last Straw", accusing Sandefur of only lightly punishing child pornographers and men who sexually assaulted or raped children. Sandefur angrily called the ad's claims "lies". Other attack ads were also run by the RSLC. Meanwhile, the Montana Trial Lawyers Association endorsed Sandefur.

The "Last Straw" ad drew condemnation from a wide range of sources. Mike McGrath, Chief Justice of the Montana Supreme Court (and a Sandefur endorser), claimed the ad cherry picked Sandefur's record and attacked the RSLC as a dark money organization whose secrecy was alien to Montana values. By October 20, 25 current and former judges across the state had denounced the ad in a joint letter sent to newspapers throughout the state. Sandefur responded to the attack ad by in which he said, "In Montana we can smell BS a mile away. That's what these are. Let's put them in the trash where they belong." Despite the controversy over "Last Straw", Juras was endorsed by Montana Supreme Court Associate Justice Jim Rice.

Additional controversies erupted in October as well. On October 11, 8th District Court Judge Greg Pinski accused Juras of violating the Montana Code of Judicial Conduct by having contributed $50 to SafeMontana, a group opposed to Montana's medical marijuana law. Pinski noted that Juras made the donation a month after she had filed for her Supreme Court candidacy, and that the code of conduct prohibited judicial candidates from engaging in partisan activity. Both Pinski and retired Montana Supreme Court Associate Justice James C. Nelson said the donation called into question Juras' objectivity, especially since medical marijuana issues often came before the state supreme court. Sandefur, who said he knew of Juras' donation when it was made, had no comment. On October 19, Juras accused Sandefur of using his courtroom as a backdrop in his television ads. She argued that this violated the Montana Code of Judicial Conduct. Sandefur said that use of a courtroom as a backdrop had received approval from both the Montana Commissioner of Political Practices and the Montana State Attorney General. The two candidates attended at forum at the UM Law School on October 19. Sandefur claimed Juras lacked the expertise to be a Montana Supreme Court judge, and trial lawyer Alexander Blewett III (for whom the law school is named) repeatedly pressed Juras to admit or deny the allegations made in the "Last Straw" and other attack ads. At the end of the forum, Juras she believed Sandefur was indeed "soft on crime".

As the race neared its conclusion, final election finance reports showed that the two candidates had raised $633,868 for their campaigns. Political action committees (PACs) raised another $518,262, each candidate raising roughly equal proportions. After adjusting for inflation, the Sandefur campaign and pro-Sandefur PACs raised about $900,000, a record for the most money raised in a Montana Supreme Court race. By October 26, total candidate, PAC, and other spending neared the $1.6 million mark, and the news media believed spending would surpass the record set in 2014.

In the final days of the campaign, the Montana Democratic Party spent more than $60,000 supporting Sandefur. Montana Commissioner of Political Practices Jonathan Motl said it was the first time in memory that a state political party had spent money in a Montana Supreme Court race. Juras condemned the expenditure, claiming Democrats had turned politicized a nonpartisan race. Republican State Leadership Committee spending topped $225,000 for Juras, while Montanans for Liberty and Justice (a trial lawyers PAC) spent more than $350,000 supporting Sandefur. Expenditures by the RSLC led the Montana Trial Lawyers Association to make two state election finance complaints. The first complaint alleged that the group StopSetEmFreeSandefur.com Committee had reported receiving nearly all its funding from the Republican State Leadership Committee—Judicial Fairness Initiative Montana PAC ("Montana PAC"), when in fact the group's funding came from the similarly-named Republican State Leadership Committee's Judicial Fairness Initiative ("Judicial Fairness Initiative"). The complaint alleged that "Judicial Fairness Initiative" failed to file reports with the state Commissioner of Political Practices regarding its operations in the state, its fundraising, and its donations to other groups, as required by state law. The second complaint alleged that StopSetEmFreeSandefur.com Committee had misreported the source of its funds, and had purposefully delayed reporting some of campaign activity in violation of state law. The two national groups had spent at least $268,000 opposing Sandefur.

In the general nonpartisan election held on November 8, 2016, Dirk Sandefur received 56.1 percent of the vote (254,811), while Kristen Juras received 43.9 percent of the vote (199,148).

The Sandefur campaign raised more than $504,000 in the race. Pro-Sandefur political action committees raised another $1 million, while the Montana Democratic Party spent $62,000. The Juras campaign raised about $210,000. Pro-Juras political action committees raised another $268,000.

First Supreme Court term
Dirk Sandefur was sworn in for an eight-year term on the Montana Supreme Court on January 2, 2017.

Personal life
Sandefur has three adult children (son Taylor, daughter Tess, and son Dylan) from a prior marriage and has been married to Julie Sandefur, f/k/a Julie Macek-Randono, since 2019.

Electoral history

2002

2008

2014

2016

References
Notes

Citations

Bibliography

External links
 Official Supreme Court bio
 
 Campaign Website: Sandefur for Justice

1961 births
Living people
Justices of the Montana Supreme Court
Politicians from Great Falls, Montana
University of Montana alumni
American municipal police officers
Public defenders
County district attorneys in Montana
20th-century American judges
Montana state court judges
21st-century American judges